Vaaimai is a 2016 Indian Tamil-language courtroom drama film written and directed by A. Senthil Kumar. Inspired by the script of Reginald Rose's Twelve Angry Men (1954), the film stars Shanthnu Bhagyaraj and Muktha Bhanu amongst an ensemble cast. Goundamani, Thyagarajan, Ramki, Urvashi, Manoj K. Bharathi, Prithvi Pandiarajan and Poornima Bhagyaraj are also part of the cast. Though production had begun in 2013, the film released following a production delay on 8 September 2016, garnering negative reviews.

Cast

 Shanthanu Bhagyaraj as Sidharthan
 Muktha Bhanu as Jhanavi
 Ramki as Thirumaaran IPS
 Thiagarajan as Dheenadayalan
 Goundamani as Dr. Benny Quick
 Manoj Bharathiraja as Manibharathi
 Urvashi as Narayani
 Poornima Bhagyaraj as Devakiammal
 Prithvi Pandiarajan as Velan
 Namo Narayana as Namo Narayanan
 Rose Venkatesan as Rose IAS
 Venkat Subha as Gopikrishna
 Ankitha Mohapatra as Chinmayi
 K. Bhagyaraj in a cameo appearance

Production
Senthil Kumar chose to make his debut with Vaaimai after his other project, Thirudan featuring Vijay Antony, ran into production troubles during 2012. Inspired by Reginald Rose's Twelve Angry Men (1954), Senthil Kumar signed on Shanthnu Bhagyaraj to play the lead role in the film. The film began its shoot in February 2013, with a bevy of retired actors making their comebacks. Goundamani, Ramki, Thiagarajan, Poornima Bhagyaraj and Manoj K. Bharathi all signed on to work on the film, several years after their previous films had released. The film was subsequently shot in places like Delhi, Rishikesh, Haridwar and Kollimalai.

After a three-year production delay, the film was readied for release in September 2016 with Vijay Sethupathi working as a narrator in the film.

Release
The film opened after a long production delay in September 2016 to negative reviews. The critic from The Hindu called it "a forgettable re-interpretation of an all-time classic" and gave the film a very negative review. A critic from Sify.com wrote "It's very difficult to tolerate when someone adapt a classic film like Twelve Angry Men with a plodding screenplay, over the top dialogues and dramatic performances! Well, if you are a fan of Twelve Angry Men, better never ever try to watch Vaaimai!", concluding "watch the film at your own risk". The reviewer from The Times of India noted "in fact, this film is — unconvincing, with writing that makes no sense and execution that is laughable".

Soundtrack
Debutant Auggath has composed the music of this movie. The song "Kanpadum Un Mugham" is the second Tamil song that Bollywood playback singer Alka Yagnik has ever sung after "Idhu Enna Mayam" from Oram Po.

References

External links
 

2016 films
2010s Tamil-language films
2010s legal drama films
Indian drama films
Indian courtroom films
Films about capital punishment
Films about murder
Films about assassinations
Juries in fiction
Films shot in Delhi
Indian legal films
Indian remakes of American films
Twelve Angry Men
2016 directorial debut films
2016 drama films